Brighouse Rangers was a (semi) professional rugby league club. This club was based in Brighouse, a town within the Metropolitan Borough of Calderdale, in West Yorkshire, England. It is situated on the River Calder and has a population of approx 35,000.

The club played in the Wartime Emergency Leagues from 1915–16 to 1918–19 (January) but not the “Victory” League.

History

Early history 
The previous Brighouse Rangers Football Club were founded in the 1870s, and joined the RFU in 1879, to become one of the founder members of the new Northern Union in 1895, played in the first season 1895–96, became the first winner of the Yorkshire Senior Competition in 1896–97, and continued for 11 seasons until 1905–06, and disbanded in summer 1906.

This club, Brighouse Rangers was in existence in 1915, but otherwise there is very little publicised information available.

Wartime Emergency League
Brighouse Rangers joined the War League for season 1915–16 and spent three and a half years with very little success.

In the first season 1915–16 the club finished bottom out of the 24 clubs with 3 points.

In the second season 1916–17 Brighouse Rangers managed to finish second bottom out of 26 clubs with 2 points. The bottom club York also had 2 points, but had played one game more and therefore had a poorer percentage rating.

In the third season 1917–18 the club managed a slight improvement finishing 18th out of 22.

The next season, 1918–19 (Jan), commenced as another Wartime Emergency League but with the end of the war, the programme was terminated in January 1919, and a quickly arranged and shortened “Victory" League programme was instigated.

This programme was never completed - and no league tables were ever produced.

It is assumed that the club continued to have very limited success and folded before the start of the 1919 (Feb-May) “Victory” League as they do not appear in the league tables for this season.

Note - Nowhere in the official archives is the word "Victory" used. It has been used in this article to distinguish between the two competitions held in the 1918–19 season.

Successor clubs
Brighouse Rugby League club have reformed numerous times since then.

The current club are amateurs Brighouse Rangers ARLFC. In the 1970 Brighouse played at Wellholme Park, near the Cricket Club. Towards the approach of the new millennium in 2000, Tesco bought the site including Brighouse ARLFC clubhouse and with the money, the club built anew on Russell Way, off Bradford Road.

Records

Club league performance

Club league record 

Heading Abbreviations
Pl = Games played; W = Win; D = Draw; L = Lose; PF = Points for; PA = Points against; Diff = Points difference (+ or -); Pts = League Points 
League points: for win = 2; for draw = 1; for loss = 0.

Several fixtures and results 
The following a one of Brighouse Rangers’ fixtures for the four seasons in which they participated in the Wartime Emergency League :-
 
 
 
 

Heading Abbreviations
CC Rx = Challenge Cup Round x; WEL = Wartime Emergency League:

Notes and comments 
1 - The name "Victory" League is not used on official documents. It also has only been used here to distinguish between the two programmes which ran during the 1918–19 season.

See also 
British rugby league system
1915–16 Northern Rugby Football Union Wartime Emergency League season
1916–17 Northern Rugby Football Union Wartime Emergency League season
1917–18 Northern Rugby Football Union Wartime Emergency League season
1918–19 (January) Northern Rugby Football Union Wartime Emergency League season
1919 (Feb-May) Northern Rugby Football Union Victory season
History of rugby league
The Great Schism – Rugby League View
The Great Schism – Rugby Union View
List of defunct rugby league clubs
Brighouse - Sport - Rugby league

References

External links 
1896–97 Northern Rugby Football Union season at wigan.rlfans.com
Hull&Proud Fixtures & Results 1896/1897
Widnes Vikings - One team, one passion Season In Review - 1896–97
Saints Heritage Society
Warington History
Brighouse Rangers ARLFC - History

Rugby league teams in West Yorkshire
Defunct rugby league teams in England
Sport in Calderdale
Brighouse
Rugby clubs established in 1915
1915 establishments in England
English rugby league teams